The Venezuela clawed gecko (Pseudogonatodes lunulatus) is a species of lizard in the family Sphaerodactylidae. It is endemic to Venezuela.

References

Pseudogonatodes
Reptiles of Venezuela
Endemic fauna of Venezuela
Reptiles described in 1927
Taxa named by Jean Roux